The  is a mini MPV produced by the Japanese automaker Honda since 2008. The vehicle is designed mainly for the need of Japanese consumers. It is based on the Fit/Jazz platform and acts as a replacement for the first generation Mobilio in Japan. Three different versions of the Freed are available: a six-seater version which features captain’s seats in the second row, a seven-seater version and a five-seater version. Honda also stated that a wheelchair-accessible model is offered in addition to versions with a side lift-up seat and passenger lift-up seat.

In September 2009, it was announced that a hybrid version would be available by 2011.



First generation (GB3/GB4/GP3; 2008)

Engine
The Freed is equipped with a 1.5 L engine with 118 horsepower, which is the same engine that is used in the Jazz/City, but the engine used has more torque.

Japan
The first generation Freed was available in Japan in two types; the petrol powered in G or G Aero grade and also a hybrid variant. The hybrid variant uses i-VTEC together with Honda's IMA hybrid car technology.

The facelifted Freed was launched in the Japanese market on 28 October 2011, securing sales of over 20,000 units in its first two weeks on sale, of which 63% were of the hybrid model.

Freed Spike
In 2010, Honda released the 'soul twinbrother' of Freed called Freed Spike for Japanese markets only. Honda said that this car is a "compact multi-wagon" for the people with "active lifestyle."

This car features a whole different grille, headlamps and front fascia; a covered third side window, partially covered tail lights and new alloy wheels. Inside, apart from the familiarly similar dashboard to Freed, it has a dual height floor in the cargo area and some additional storage areas on the side panels.

Indonesia

On 21 March 2009, the first generation Freed was launched in Indonesia, the second country where the Freed was released after Japan. It was assembled at Honda Prospect Motor's Karawang plant and exported to other Southeast Asian markets. The Freed's ground clearance is 20 mm higher. For the Indonesian market, the Freed uses the 7-seater layout and a 5-speed automatic transmission instead of CVT in the Japanese domestic market version.

The Freed for the Indonesian market consists of 3 trim levels, the A, S and E. It received a facelift on 8 May 2012 adding a double blower AC for the S and E trim. The E trim comes with anti pinch function on both sliding doors, retractable door mirror with turning lamps and double DIN audio monitor with iPod/iPhone compatible.

The model received another refresh in September 2014 with the addition of 3 wide horizontal lines front grille (similar to the first facelift JDM 2011 Freed G Aero), silver accent on the sides of the stop lamp and cruise control for the E trim before it was discontinued due to poor sales figure.

Thailand
In 2010, the Freed was launched in Thailand. It was imported from Indonesia. It was only available in four trim levels (S, E, E Sport and E Sport NAVI).

Malaysia
On 22 April 2010, the Freed was launched in Malaysia. It was only available in one trim level (Grade E). Honda Malaysia's target sales were 1,200 units a year.

In July 2012, Honda Malaysia added a cheaper version of the Honda Freed called the Grade S; it was priced RM99,800 on-the-road with insurance, squeezing it below the RM100,000 mark. Features lost from the Grade E model were the powered sliding rear doors with remote operation, automatic air conditioning, indicators for the side mirrors or intermittent wipers, tail spoiler, and the Alpine DVD player.

In January 2013, Honda Malaysia launched the facelifted model to Malaysia. Like before, it was available in two trim levels (Grade E and Grade S). The Grade E model gained some extra features which included leather seats, and fold-down armrests for both front seats are now available across the board (previously only the driver and two mid-row chairs had armrests).

The lower spec Grade S is available in Brilliant White Pearl, Polished Metal Metallic and Crystal Black Pearl. The pricier Grade E can only be had in Brilliant White Pearl.

Hong Kong
On 23 January 2011, the Freed was officially launched in Hong Kong. Unlike other non-Japanese market models, all Freeds sold in Hong Kong are manufactured in Japan and seats 6 passengers.

Singapore
In Singapore, the Freed is available through parallel import distributors.

Second generation (GB5/GB6/GB7/GB8; 2016) 

The second generation Freed was revealed in June 2016 and released in Japan on 16 September 2016.

The second generation Freed is conceived based on the "Dynamism and Functionality" theme, does not differ much in looks from its curvier predecessor. Apart from the updated grille and lights, the new Freed retains the rear sliding doors with some minor improvements. Its marketing campaign heavily used Happy by Pharrell Williams.

It is also offered in five-seater option as the Freed+, which replaced the Freed Spike in the previous generation.

On 15 December 2017, the Freed Modulo X was released in Japan. It featured a full body kit, front and rear bumpers, side skirts, and a tailgate spoiler.

Facelift
The second generation Freed received its facelift and was released on 18 October 2019, as announced on 30 August 2019. The frontal section has been revised with an angular edged body coloured grille similar to the new Fit along with redesigned foglamps. In its interior, it uses a lighter trimming on the dashboard panel. Together with this facelift, the crossover SUV-inspired variant of the Freed, called Freed Crosstar, was added.

The facelifted second generation Freed went on sale in Singapore in early August 2022 through Honda's official distributor Kah Motor and was imported from Japan. It is available in two trim levels (S7 and E7). The Freed Hybrid is also available in Singapore through parallel import distributors.

Sales

References

External links 

 Official website

Minivans
Freed
Hybrid minivans
Vehicles with CVT transmission
Front-wheel-drive vehicles
2010s cars
Cars introduced in 2008
Mini MPVs